Foglesong is a surname. Notable people with the surname include:

Bobby Foglesong (born 1987), American soccer player
Jim Foglesong (1922–2013), American country music producer and executive
Richard Foglesong, American academic and writer
Robert H. Foglesong (born 1945), United States Air Force general